Arthur Honegger (10 March 1892 – 27 November 1955) was a Swiss composer who was born in France and lived a large part of his life in Paris. A member of Les Six, his best known work is probably Antigone, composed between 1924 and 1927 to the French libretto by Jean Cocteau based on the tragedy Antigone by Sophocles. It premiered on 28 December 1927 at the Théâtre Royal de la Monnaie with sets designed by Pablo Picasso and costumes by Coco Chanel. However, his most frequently performed work is probably the orchestral work Pacific 231, which was inspired by the sound of a steam locomotive.

Biography

Born Oscar-Arthur Honegger (the first name was never used) to Swiss parents in Le Havre, France, he initially studied harmony with Robert-Charles Martin (to whom he dedicated his first published work<ref>Pierre Meylan (1982) Honegger, L'Âge d'Homme, 17</ref>) and violin in Le Havre. After studying for two years at the Zurich Conservatory, he enrolled in the Paris Conservatoire from 1911 to 1918, studying with both Charles-Marie Widor and Vincent d'Indy. He made his Paris compositional debut in 1916 and in 1918 wrote the ballet Le dit des jeux du monde, generally considered to be his first characteristic work. In 1926 he married Andrée Vaurabourg, a pianist and fellow student at the Paris Conservatoire, on the condition that they live in separate apartments because he required solitude for composing. Andrée lived with her mother, and Honegger visited them for lunch every day. They lived apart for the duration of their marriage, with the exception of one year from 1935 to 1936 following Vaurabourg's injury in a car accident, and the last year of Honegger's life, when he was not well enough to live alone. They had one daughter, Pascale, born in 1932. Honegger also had a son, Jean-Claude (1926–2003), with the singer Claire Croiza.

In the early 1920s, Honegger shot to fame with his "dramatic psalm" Le Roi David (King David), which is still in the choral repertoire. Between World War I and World War II, Honegger was very prolific. He composed the music for Abel Gance's epic 1927 film, Napoléon,  which was preceded by J'accuse (1919) and La Roue ("The Wheel") (1923). He composed nine ballets and three vocal stage works, amongst other works. One of those stage works, Jeanne d'Arc au bûcher (1935), a "dramatic oratorio" (to words by Paul Claudel), is thought of as one of his finest works. In addition to his pieces written alone, he collaborated with Jacques Ibert on both an opera, L'Aiglon (1937), and an operetta. During this time period, he also wrote Danse de la chèvre (1921), which has become a staple in the flute repertoire. Dedicated to René Le Roy and written for solo flute, this piece is lively and charming but with the same directness of all Honegger's work.

Honegger always remained in touch with Switzerland, his parent's country of origin, until the outbreak of the war and the invasion of the Nazis made it impossible for him to leave Paris. He joined the French Resistance and was generally unaffected by the Nazis themselves, who allowed him to continue his work without too much interference. He also taught composition at the École Normale de Musique de Paris, where his students included Yves Ramette. However, he was greatly depressed by the war. Between its outbreak and his death, he wrote his last four symphonies (numbers two to five), which are among the most powerful symphonic works of the 20th century. Of these, the second, for strings, featuring a solo trumpet that plays a chorale tune in the style of Bach in the final movement, and the third, subtitled Symphonie Liturgique with three movements that evoke the Requiem Mass (Dies irae, De profundis clamavi and Dona nobis pacem), is probably the best known. Written in 1946, just after the end of the war, it has parallels with Benjamin Britten's Sinfonia da Requiem of 1940. In contrast with this work is the lyrical, nostalgic Symphony No. 4, subtitled "Deliciae Basilienses" ("The Delights of Basel"), written as a tribute to days of relaxation spent in that Swiss city during the war.

Honegger was widely known as a train enthusiast and once notably said: "I have always loved locomotives passionately. For me they are living creatures and I love them as others love women or horses." His "mouvement symphonique" Pacific 231 (a depiction of a steam locomotive) gained him early notoriety in 1923.

Many of Honegger's works were championed by his longtime friend Georges Tzipine, who conducted the premiere recordings of some of them (Cris du Monde oratorio, Nicolas de Flüe).

In 1953 he wrote his last composition, A Christmas Cantata. After a protracted illness, he died at home in Paris of a heart attack on 27 November 1955 and was interred in the Saint-Vincent Cemetery in the Montmartre Quarter. He was given a state funeral by the French government, although he remained a Swiss national and never took French citizenship.

The principal elements of Honegger's style are Bachian counterpoint, driving rhythms, melodic amplitude, highly coloristic harmonies, an impressionistic use of orchestral sonorities, and a concern for formal architecture. His style is weightier and more solemn than that of his colleagues in Les Six. Far from reacting against German romanticism as the other members of Les Six did, Honegger's mature works show evidence of a distinct influence by it. Despite the differences in their styles, he and fellow Les Six member Darius Milhaud were close friends, having studied together at the Paris Conservatoire. Milhaud dedicated his fourth string quintet to Honegger's memory, while Francis Poulenc similarly dedicated his Clarinet Sonata.

Legacy
Honegger was pictured on the Swiss twenty franc banknote (eighth series), issued October 1996 and replaced in 2017.

Honegger's symphonic movement Rugby was recorded with him conducting the Paris Symphony Orchestra in a 1929 electrical recording, which can be heard on YouTube. Many of Honegger's recordings as conductor of his music have been reissued on CD by Pearl and Dutton.

The ice hockey player Doug Honegger is his grandnephew.

Notable compositions

Opus numbers originate from the complete catalogue by Harry Halbreich. For a longer list of compositions, see List of compositions by Arthur Honegger. For a list of select recordings, see Arthur Honegger discography.

 Orchestral Music :
Symphonies :
1930 : H 75 First Symphony
1941 : H 153 Second Symphony for strings and trumpet in D
1946 : H 186 Third Symphony (Symphonie Liturgique)
1946 : H 191 Fourth Symphony in A (Deliciae basiliensis)
1950 : H 202 Fifth Symphony in D (Di tre re)
Symphonic Movements :
1923 : H 53 Pacific 231 (Symphonic Movement No. 1)
1928 : H 67 Rugby (Symphonic Movement No. 2)
1933 : H 83 Symphonic Movement No. 3
Concerti :

1924 : H 55 Concertino for piano and orchestra in E major
1929 : H 72 Concerto for cello and orchestra in C major
1948 : H 196 Concerto da camera, for flute, English horn and strings
Others :
1917 : H 16 Le chant de Nigamon1920 : H 31 Pastorale d'été1923 : H 47 Chant de joie (Song of Joy)
1951 : H 204 Monopartita Oratorios :
1921 : H 37 Le roi David (King David) libretto by René Morax, version for orchestra in 1923
1935 : H 99 Jeanne d'Arc au bûcher, libretto by Paul Claudel, version with prologue in 1941
1938 : H 131 La danse des morts, (The Dance of the Dead) libretto by Paul Claudel
1953 : H 212 Une cantate de Noël (A Christmas Cantata)

 Operas :
1903 : Philippa, not orchestrated, performed, or published
1904 : Sigismond, lost
1907 : La Esmeralda, after Victor Hugo's Notre-Dame de Paris, unfinished and unpublished
1918 : La mort de sainte Alméenne, libretto by M. Jacob, unpublished and only Interlude orchestrated
1925 : Judith, libretto by René Morax, premiered at the Opéra de Monte-Carlo on 13 February 1925
1927 : H 65 Antigone, libretto by Jean Cocteau based on Sophocles, premiered at La Monnaie on 28 December 1927

 Operettas :
1925 :  H 108 L'Aiglon, co-written with Jacques Ibert; libretto for acts 2–4 by H. Cain, after E. Rostand, libretto for acts 1 and 5 by Ibert, Opéra de Monte-Carlo, 10 March 1937
1930 : Les aventures du roi Pausole, libretto by A. Willemetz, after P. Louÿs, premiered 12 December 1930, Paris, Bouffes-Parisiens
1931 : La belle de Moudon, libretto by René Morax, Mézières, Jorat, Switzerland, 30 May 1931, unpublished
1937 : Les petites cardinal, libretto by Willemetz and P. Brach, after L. Halévy, Paris, Bouffes-Parisiens, 13 February 1938

 Ballets :
1918 : H 19 Le dit des jeux du monde1921 : H 38 Horace victorieux, symphonie mimée

 Chamber music :
1917 : H 15 String Quartet No. 1 in C minor
1929:  H 28 Sonata for Viola and Piano
1935 : H 103 String Quartet No. 2 in D
1937 : H 114 String Quartet No. 3 in E
1945 : H 181 Paduana for cello solo
1947 : H 193 Intrada for C trumpet and piano
 Piano Solo Works 1910 : Three Pieces (Scherzo, Humoresque, Adagio)
1916 : Toccata and Variation
1915–9 : Three Pieces (Prelude, Homage to Ravel, Danse)
1919–20 : Seven Short Pieces
1920 : Sarabande (for Album de Six)
1923–4 : Le Cahier Romand
1928–9 Hommage to Albert Roussel
1932 : Prelude, Arioso and Fughetta on the name BACH
1941 : Petits Airs sue une basse celebre
1943–4 : Two Sketches

References

Further reading
Honegger's biographer was Marcel Landowski, the French composer and arts administrator, who was greatly influenced by Honegger. His biography appeared in 1978 although it has yet to be translated into English.
Harry Halbreich. Arthur Honegger, translated into English by Roger Nichols. Portland, Oregon: Amadeus Press, 1992. Considers both Honegger's life and works. With the cooperation of Honegger's daughter Pascale, Halbreich has fully documented Honegger's life since childhood. All works are treated, more significant ones analyzed in detail.  (1999).
Geoffrey Spratt. The Music of Arthur Honegger. Cork University Press, 1987. Spratt also wrote the entry in Grove Music Online (2001).
Willy Tappet. Arthur Honegger. Zurich: Atlantis Verlag, 1954.

External links

 

 Site Arthur Honegger – The official site on the composer; bilingual (French and English)
 Unlocking the Mystery of Honegger
 Holocaust Music – discusses the controversy of Honegger's role in the Resistance
 Cello Concerto Review
 Drama lírico Bíblico, Judith (audio online y descarga).
 Arthur Honegger – biography of the composer
 František Sláma Archive. More on the history of the Czech Philharmonic between the 1940s and the 1980s: Conductors''

1892 births
1955 deaths
20th-century classical composers
French male classical composers
French opera composers
Swiss classical composers
Ballet composers
Male opera composers
Neoclassical composers
Oratorio composers
Academic staff of the École Normale de Musique de Paris
Conservatoire de Paris alumni
Grand Officiers of the Légion d'honneur
Les Six
Musicians from Le Havre
Pupils of Vincent d'Indy
Zurich University of the Arts alumni
20th-century French male musicians
20th-century Swiss composers